Stempfferia moyambina, the Moyamba epitola, is a butterfly in the family Lycaenidae. It is found in Sierra Leone, Ivory Coast, Ghana and southern and eastern Nigeria. The habitat consists of forests.

References

Butterflies described in 1903
Poritiinae
Butterflies of Africa
Taxa named by George Thomas Bethune-Baker